Herviella claror is a species of sea slug, an aeolid nudibranch, a marine gastropod mollusc in the family Facelinidae. This species was derived from Australia.

References

Facelinidae
Gastropods described in 1963